Mahmudabad (also Romanized as Maḩmūdābād; also known as Ḩowz Kholeh) is a village in Palanganeh Rural District, in the Central District of Javanrud County, Kermanshah Province, Iran. At the 2006 census, its population was 65, in 12 families.

References 

Populated places in Javanrud County